The Social Insurance Institute (ISSH) is an Albanian government agency that administers the coverage of pensions and other social insurance services in Albania.

References

Government agencies of Albania
Social Services agencies of Albania
Albania